Yevgeny Ivanovich Nosov (January 15,
1925 in Kursk, USSR – June 13, 2002 in Kursk, Russian Federation) was a Soviet Russian writer, part of the village prose movement, who since 1958 (when he debuted with On the Fisherman's Trail, a collection of stories and short novels) contributed regularly to Nash Sovremennik and Novy Mir magazines. Nosov, who fought in World War II and was severely injured in February 1945, received two Orders of Lenin (1984, 1990) and the Hero of the Socialist Labour (1990) title. In 2001 he was awarded the Solzhenitsyn Prize for having created works that "...highlighted the tragedy of the War and the immense consequences it had for the Russian village, revealed to the full extent the belated bitterness of forgotten and neglected war veterans."

References 

1925 births
2002 deaths
Soviet writers
Writers from Kursk
Recipients of the Order of Lenin
Solzhenitsyn Prize winners